Christian Albrecht Bluhme (27 December 1794 – 6 November 1866) was a Danish lawyer and conservative politician who was the second Prime Minister of Denmark (first time from 1852 to 1853 with title of Prime Minister, second time from 1864 to 1865 with title of council president). He led the country during the latter part of the Second Schleswig War.

Biography
Bluhme was born in Copenhagen, Denmark as the son of a commander in the navy Hans Emilius Bluhme.  Bluhme went to Herlufsholm School, where he became a legal candidate in 1816.  In 1820 he became an auditor to the 2nd Jutland Regiment and two years after also the assessor in the Land Surveyor. In  1824, he went to the Governing Council in Trankebar. He returned to Denmark and was appointed in 1831 with the title of State Council to the town and county bailiff at Store Heddinge in Zealand. In 1838 he was appointed  officer of the Diocese of Aalborg. He was called in 1843 to participate in the administration as Director of the General Chamber of Commerce and the College of Commerce, whose president he became in January 1848.

Personal life	
In 1832, he married Rasmine Wandel (1813–1865), daughter of regimental surgeon in Copenhagen C.F. Wandel. He was the father of naval officer Hans Emil Bluhme (1833–1926).

References

1794 births
1866 deaths
Politicians from Copenhagen
Prime Ministers of Denmark
Foreign ministers of Denmark
19th-century Danish people
19th-century Danish politicians
Members of the Rigsrådet (1855-1866)